Cratylism as a philosophical theory reflects the teachings of the Athenian Cratylus (also transliterated as Kratylos), fl. mid to late 5th century BCE. Cratylism holds that there is a natural relationship between words and what words designate.

Cratylus is more popularly known as Socrates' antagonist in Plato's dialogue Cratylus.

Cratylism is distinguished from linguisticity by the problematic status of style: in a natural language, where a perfect connection is found between word and things, variations of style are no longer conceivable.

Gérard Genette divided the theory into primary and secondary Cratylism. The former is said to involve a general attempt to establish a motivated link between the signifier and the signified by inventing emotional values for certain sounds while the latter admits that language has fallen and that the signifier enjoys an arbitrary relation to the signified.

Cratylism reaches similar conclusions about the nature of reality and communication that Taoism and Zen Buddhism also confronted: how can a mind in flux, in a flowing world, hold on to any solid "truth" and convey it to another mind? Pyrrhonism is also similar with respect to its "undogmatic and relaxed use of words."

A fellow-Greek sophist, Gorgias, expressed an equally ironic cul de sac conclusion about the nature of human epistemological understanding: 
"Nothing exists. Even if something did exist, nothing can be known about it; and even if something can be known about it, knowledge about it cannot be communicated to others. And, finally, even if it can be communicated, it cannot be understood."

See also
 Natural language
 Quietism (disambiguation)

References

Theories of language
Logic